Payal Shah Karwa is an Indian author popular for her book The Bad Touch

Early life
Payal Shah Karwa was born in Mumbai, Maharashtra. Payal attended the St Teresa's Convent High School in Santacruz, Mumbai and completed her B.Com from Narsee Monjee College of Commerce and Economics. After that, she completed her Post Graduation Diploma in Advertising and Communications from Narsee Monjee Institute of Management Studies (NMIMS) in Juhu Vile Parle Mumbai.

Personal life
She met her life partner, Rahul Karwa, at NMIMS and after their marriage in 2005, they continue living in Mumbai with their twin girls Adweta and Aarna. Rahul is the CEO of an event and content company.

Career

Early career
After completing her Post Graduation, Payal worked in the field of brand communication in Midas Events, Ogilvy & Mather, Hanmer MS&L and Out of Home Media India Pvt Ltd. In 2009 she started her content agency The Word Jockey since December 2015.

In 2009, she also started working on her first book – The Bad Touch, which was based on the subject of child sex abuse.  The book had stories about activist Harish Iyer, Director Anurag Kashyap and others.

The book was published by Hay House Marketing and launched in April 2013 by celebrity actress Tara Sharma Saluja, and artist Brinda Miller.

Later career
Currently she is Content Director at The Word Jockey Creative Content Studio.
She has also founded the website on women's intimate health to break taboos surrounding sexual health issues, and co-founded a channel on kids’ content Yabadabadoo Kids.

She is a speaker and trainer, and has addressed audiences at various forums like Science of Storytelling at Nehru Science Centre, Times of India Literacy Carnival, TMFA, Merck, Kala Ghoda Arts Festival, Global Content Summit etc.

References

English-language writers from India
Living people
21st-century Indian women writers
21st-century Indian writers
Women writers from Maharashtra
Year of birth missing (living people)